Betbezer-d'Armagnac is a commune in the Landes department in Nouvelle-Aquitaine in southwestern France.

Population

See also
Communes of the Landes department

References

Communes of Landes (department)